Charles Muntanga (born 21 July 1997) is a Zambian football goalkeeper who currently plays for Nkwazi F.C.

References

1997 births
Living people
Zambian footballers
Zambia international footballers
Nchanga Rangers F.C. players
Nkwazi F.C. players
Association football goalkeepers